Döng-Alysh is a village in Naryn Region of Kyrgyzstan. It is part of the Kochkor District. Its population was 3,247 in 2021.

References
 

Populated places in Naryn Region